Fortuna Foothills is a census-designated place (CDP) in Yuma County, Arizona, United States. The population was 26,265 at the 2010 census. It is part of the Yuma Metropolitan Statistical Area. Development of the area began in the 1960s, when local developer Hank Schechert purchased 3,000 acres east of Yuma. Fortuna Foothills serves as a bedroom community for Yuma, Yuma Proving Ground, and Marine Corps Air Station Yuma. Fortuna Foothills is also an area with a large amount of seasonal residents.

Geography
Fortuna Foothills is located at  (32.657713, -114.411808).

Demographics

At the 2000 census there were 20,478 people, 9,652 households, and 7,364 families in the CDP. The racial makeup of the CDP was 90.1% White, 0.4% Black or African American, 0.7% Native American, 0.5% Asian, 0.1% Pacific Islander, 6.6% from other races, and 1.6% from two or more races.  12.7% of the population were Hispanic or Latino of any race.
Of the 9,652 households 11.9% had children under the age of 18 living with them, 71.1% were married couples living together, 3.5% had a female householder with no husband present, and 23.7% were non-families. 19.2% of households were one person and 12.4% were one person aged 65 or older.  The average household size was 2.11 and the average family size was 2.37.

The age distribution was 11.8% under the age of 18, 2.8% from 18 to 24, 13.1% from 25 to 44, 27.9% from 45 to 64, and 44.5% 65 or older.  The median age was 63 years. For every 100 females, there were 97.5 males.  For every 100 females age 18 and over, there were 95.9 males.

The median household income was $34,135 and the median family income  was $37,031. Males had a median income of $34,284 versus $24,576 for females. The per capita income for the CDP was $19,986.  About 7.3% of families and 10.6% of the population were below the poverty line, including 23.3% of those under age 18 and 5.6% of those age 65 or over.

Transportation
 Yuma County Area Transit
 Interstate 8

References

Census-designated places in Yuma County, Arizona